Bucculatrix adelpha is a moth species in the family Bucculatricidae. It was first described in 1963 by Annette Frances Braun, and is found in North America, where it has been recorded in Ontario, Indiana and Maine.

The wingspan is 8-9.4 mm. The forewings are brown, somewhat darkened toward the costa between white costal streaks. A whitish longitudinal streak runs from the base of the costa to about one-fourth the wing length. There is an oblique white streak before the middle of the costa and a less oblique white streak at two-thirds of the costa. The hindwings are dark grey. Adults have been recorded on wing in June and July.

The larvae feed on Aster species, including Aster cordifolius.

References

External links
Natural History Museum Lepidoptera generic names catalog

Bucculatricidae
Moths of North America
Moths described in 1963
Taxa named by Annette Frances Braun